Avalanche Press is an American company that publishes board wargames and has published some role-playing game supplements. They have produced The Great War at Sea and Panzer Grenadier series, as well as Red Parachutes, one of their earliest games and a detailed study of the Soviet crossing of the Dnepr River in 1943.

History
Avalanche Press was started in 1994 by Mike Bennighof and Brian Knipple. In 1996, Avalanche Press released the first game in the Great War at Sea series. Twice, the series has won the Origins Award for the best historical game of the year. They have also received many finalist nominations for the Origins Awards.

Avalanche Press was one of the publishers who began producing role-playing game supplements for the d20 System by 2002. From 2000 to 2005, Avalanche Press produced products using the open-source d20 system.  The book Celtic Age won the 2002 Origins Award for Best RPG Supplement. Avalanche Press obtained the license to produce a game based on the Iron Empires comics by Christopher Moeller, and wanted to release a d20 setting book titled Iron Empires Lost Histories in 2004, and when Luke Crane contacted Moeller in 2005 to offer his help, he learned that the project was not being worked on and so Moeller reached a new licensing deal with Crane to publish it.

Avalanche Press' physical plant is located in Irondale, Alabama after previously being in Virginia Beach, Virginia.

Future games survey
On September 12, 2008, Avalanche Press posted a survey so that fans could vote on games that they would like to see made.  These games include a variation of the Great War at Sea series during the age of sail, a conflict between the United States and Canada on the Great Lakes during the 1920s, an updated version of U.S. Navy Plan Orange, a game covering the German Plan Z, a World War II air combat game, a game covering the Six-Day War as well as one based on Napoleon's campaigns.

Series
Eagles of the Empire series
The Great War at Sea series—Dreadnought era naval combat
Infantry Attacks series—World War I tactical combat (a spinoff of Panzer Grenadier)
Panzer Grenadier series—World War II tactical combat
Rome at War series—Ancient warfare series (closely related to the Napoleonic Battles series)
Second World War at Sea series—World War II naval combat (a spinoff of Great War at Sea)
Third Reich/Great Pacific War series—World War II strategic game

Games

0-9
1898: The Spanish–American War (2000)
1904–1905: The Russo-Japanese War (1999)

A
Afrika Korps: The Desert War (2002)
Airborne (2002)
Airborne: Introductory Edition (2006)
Airlines (1998)
Alaska's War (2007)
Alsace 1945 (2005)
America Triumphant: Battle of the Bulge (2003)
Avalanche: The Invasion of Italy (1994)

B
Battle of the Bulge (2002)
Beyond Normandy (2004)
Bismark (2005)
Bitter Victory: Sicily 1943 (2006)
Blood on the Snow (1995)
Bomb Alley (2002)

C
Chickamauga & Chattanooga (2003)
Cruiser Warfare (2004)

D
Defiant Russia: 1941 (2004)
Desert Rats (2004)
Digging (game) (1999)

E
Eastern Fleet (2001)
Eastern Front (2005)

F
Fading Legions (2002)

G
Gazala: 1942 (2005)
Gettysburg 1863 (2002)
Granada: The Fall of Moslem Spain (2003)
Great Pacific War (2003)
Great War at Sea: The North and Baltic Seas (1998)
Great War at Sea: The Mediterranean (1996, 2001)

H
Hannibal at Bay (2000)
Heroes of the Soviet Union (2001)

I
Imperium: Third Millennium (2001)
Infantry Attacks: Empires End (2007)
Island of Death: The Invasion of Malta, 1942 (2006)

J
Jutland (2006)

L
Leyte Gulf (2005)

M
McArthur's Return: Leyte 1944 (1994)
Midway (2002)

N
Napoleon in the Desert (2002)
Napoleon on the Danube (2005)

O
Operation Cannibal (1996)

P
Panzer Grenadier (1998)
Preussisch-Eylau (1999)

Q
Queen of the Celts (2007)

R 
 Red God of War (2005)
 Red Parachutes (2005)
 Red Steel: Clash of Armor at Kishinev (1997)
 Red Vengeance (2005)
 Red Warriors (2006)
 Res Publica (1999)
 Road to Berlin (2005)

S
Scotland the Brave (1998)
Sea of Troubles (2007)
Semper Fi! Guadalcanal (2003)
Sinister Forces (2006)
Soldier Emperor (2003)
Soldier Kings (2002)
Soldier Raj (2004)
SOPAC (1999)
Strange Defeat: The Fall of France, 1940 (2006)
Strike South (2005)
Survival of the Witless (1997)

T
Tears of the Dragon (2003)
They Shall Not Pass: The Battle of Verdun, 1916 (2006)
Third Reich (2001)
Tiger of Malaya (2006)

U
U.S. Navy Plan Black (1999)
U.S. Navy Plan Crimson (2008)
U.S. Navy Plan Gold (2006)
U.S. Navy Plan Orange (1998)
U.S. Navy Plan Red (2002)

W
Winter Fury (2001)

Supplements
All For One, One For All
Arctic Front (2002)
Aztecs: Empire of the Dying Sun
Celtic Age
Distant Oceans (2003)
Doom of Odin
Dreadnoughts (2004)
East of Suez
Edelweiss (2003)
Endless Sands
Great White Fleet
Greenland Saga
I, Mordred
Jungle Fighting (2004)
Little People
Nile Empire
Noble Knights
Noble Steeds
Player's Guide: Third Reich/Great Pacific War (2004)
Ragnarok!
Tank Battles (2003)
Twilight of Atlantis
Viking Age
Vlad, the Impaler
Zeppelins (2006)

References

External links 
 Avalanche Press homepage
 

Board game publishing companies
Game manufacturers
Role-playing game publishing companies
Wargame companies